2017 Lahore suicide bombing may refer to:
 
February 2017 Lahore suicide bombing
April 2017 Lahore suicide bombing
July 2017 Lahore suicide bombing